Scacco alla regina, internationally released as Check to the Queen, is a 1969 Italian comedy film directed by Pasquale Festa Campanile.

It is based on the novel The Slave by Renato Ghiotto.

Plot 
Margaret Mevin is an arrogant famous actress, accustomed to being served and revered by the people whom she surrounds herself. Silvia comes to her service as a lady companion, but her submissive role soon acquires masochistic traits and homosexual shades.

Cast 
Rosanna Schiaffino: Margaret Mevin
Haydée Politoff: Silvia
Romolo Valli: Enrico Valdam
Aldo Giuffrè: Spartaco
Daniela Surina: Dina
Gabriele Tinti

References

External links

1969 films
Italian comedy films
1969 comedy films
Films directed by Pasquale Festa Campanile
Italian LGBT-related films
1960s Italian films